This is a list of castles in South Ayrshire.

List

See also
 Castles in Scotland
 List of castles in Scotland
 List of listed buildings in South Ayrshire

Notes

References
 Coventry, Martin (2001) The Castles of Scotland, 3rd Ed. Scotland: Goblinshead 
 Coventry, Martin (2010) Castles of the Clans Scotland: Goblinshead 
 Pattullo, Nan (1974) Castles, Houses and Gardens of Scotland Edinburgh: Denburn Press

External links
Video footage of Carleton Castle

 
South Ayrshire